War Babies is the third studio album by American pop music duo Daryl Hall & John Oates. The album was released in October of 1974, by Atlantic Records. It was their last of three albums for Atlantic Records before moving to RCA Records. The album was produced by Todd Rundgren. Rundgren and other members of Utopia, his then-recently-formed prog-rock band, perform on the record.

The album was a radical departure from the previous two albums, alienating fans of the blue-eyed soul material that dominated the albums. War Babies is a more rock-oriented LP with heavy keyboard work, sarcastic lyrical content, and elements of hard rock. War Babies was their first charting album, reaching #86 on the Billboard 200.

On February 24, 2017, Friday Music released a remastered version of the album along with their first studio album, Whole Oats.

Track listing

Personnel 
 Daryl Hall – lead vocals (3-10), backing vocals, keyboards, synthesizers, guitars, mandolin, vibraphone
 John Oates – backing vocals, lead vocals (1, 2, 10), keyboards, synthesizers, guitars
 Don York – keyboards, arrangements on "Is It a Star", ARP String Ensemble on "70's Scenario"
 Todd Rundgren – lead guitar, backing vocals
 Richie Cerniglia – lead guitar on "Is It a Star"
 John Siegler – bass
 John "Willie" Wilcox [credited as "John G. Wilcox"] – drums
 Sandy Allen – backing vocals on "War Baby Son of Zorro" and "Johnny Gore and the "C" Eaters"
 Gail Boggs – backing vocals on "War Baby Son of Zorro" and  "Johnny Gore and the "C" Eaters"
 Hello People – backing vocals on  "Johnny Gore and the "C" Eaters"
 "Admiral Television" – "soloist" [presumably TV-broadcast noise] on "War Baby Son of Zorro"
 Tommy Mottola – voice ["Erased Conelrad warning"] on "War Baby Son of Zorro"

Production 
 Produced and Engineered by Todd Rundgren
 Assistant Engineer – David Lesage
 Mastered by Jean Ristori at Sterling Sound (New York City, New York).
 Art Direction – Bob Defrin
 Artwork – Peter Palombi
 Photography – David Gahr and Armin Kachaturian
 Musical Assistance – David LaSage and Gene Perla

References

1974 albums
Hall & Oates albums
Albums produced by Todd Rundgren
Atlantic Records albums